2000 Empress's Cup Final was the 22nd final of the Empress's Cup competition. The final was played at National Stadium in Tokyo on January 21, 2001. Nippon TV Beleza won the championship.

Overview
Nippon TV Beleza won their 5th title, by defeating defending champion Tasaki Perule FC 2–1.

Match details

See also
2000 Empress's Cup

References

Empress's Cup
2000 in Japanese women's football